Berwick and Haddington was a constituency of the House of Commons of the Parliament of the United Kingdom from 1918, when it replaced the separate Berwickshire and Haddingtonshire constituencies, until it was renamed Berwick and East Lothian for the 1950 general election. It elected one Member of Parliament (MP), using the first-past-the-post voting system.

The constituency covered the counties of Berwickshire and East Lothian.

Members of Parliament

Election results

Elections in the 1910s

Elections in the 1920s

Elections in the 1930s 

General Election 1939–40

Another General Election was required to take place before the end of 1940. The political parties had been making preparations for an election to take place and by the Autumn of 1939, the following candidates had been selected; 
Unionist:  John McEwen
Labour: John Robertson
Liberal:

Elections in the 1940s

References 

 

Historic parliamentary constituencies in Scotland (Westminster)
Constituencies of the Parliament of the United Kingdom established in 1918
Constituencies of the Parliament of the United Kingdom disestablished in 1950
1918 establishments in Scotland
Politics of East Lothian
Politics of the Scottish Borders